The 2007–08 WWHL season  was the fourth season of the Western Women's Hockey League. The Calgary Oval X-Treme defeated the Minnesota Whitecaps to claim the WWHL Champions cup.

Final standings
Note: GP = Games played, W = Wins, L = Losses, T = Ties, GF = Goals for, GA = Goals against, Pts = Points.

The Chinese national women's team  played 11 exhibition games ( 1 win and 10 defeats) against  WWHL Teams.

Playoffs
Final round: Calgary Oval X-Treme vs. Minnesota Whitecaps
 Calgary Oval X-Treme win the WWHL Champions cup.

Scoring Leaders

Goalie Leaders

See also
 Western Women's Hockey League

References

External links
   League Website

Western Women's Hockey League seasons
WWHL